Tolbachik is a volcanic complex on the Kamchatka Peninsula in the far east of Russia.  It consists of two volcanoes, Plosky (flat) Tolbachik (3,085 m) and Ostry (sharp) Tolbachik (3,682 m), which as the names suggest are respectively a flat-topped shield volcano and a peaked stratovolcano. As Ostry is the mountain's highest point, the entire mountain is often referred to as "Ostry Tolbachik", not to be confused with Ostry, a separate volcano to the north also on the Kamchatka Peninsula.

Activity 
Its eruptive history stretches back thousands of years, but the most notable eruption occurred in 1975, commonly known as "The Great Tolbachik Fissure Eruption".  It was preceded by an earthquake swarm, which led to a successful prediction of the eruption by scientists from the Russian Institute of Volcanology.  The eruption created several new cinder cones, and in terms of volume of lava emitted, was Kamchatka's largest basaltic eruption in historic times.

On November 27, 2012 a strombolian type eruption started from two fissures. Basaltic lava flows move relatively fast, and quickly flooded buildings 4 km away. The eruption continued for more than a month, as lava continued to flow from the fissures. Lava flowed up to 20 kilometers (12 miles) from the line of fissures on the volcano's southern flank. This satellite image was collected on December 22, 2012. According to the Kamchatka Volcanic Eruption Response Team (KVERT), the eruption ended September 15, 2013. Several lava caves were formed as a result of the 2012–2013 eruption.

Mineralogy
The fumarole deposits of Tolbachik are rich in exotic minerals and, 100 new minerals have been first described here including alarsite and tolbachite.

Views

See also
 List of volcanoes in Russia
 List of ultras of Northeast Asia
 Kamchatka Volcanic Eruption Response Team

References

Other references

 
 Plosky Tolbachik volcano and Tolbachik lava field
 Fedotov S.A. and Markhinin Ye.K. (Eds) (1983). The Great Tolbachik Fissure Eruption: Geological and Geophysical Data, 1975-1976. Cambridge University Press, 341 p. 
 "Fireworks" on Tolbachik - may 2013 on author's project website: "Russia Begins Here"

Active volcanoes
Volcanoes of the Kamchatka Peninsula
Mountains of the Kamchatka Peninsula
Complex volcanoes
Shield volcanoes of Russia
Stratovolcanoes of Russia
Holocene shield volcanoes
Holocene stratovolcanoes
Holocene Asia
Geological type localities